The Mid-American Conference Baseball Player of the Year is an annual award given to the Mid-American Conference's most outstanding baseball player. The award was first given after the 1986 season. , Ohio's Rudy Rott is the only two-time winner of the award.

Winners

Winners by school

Buffalo discontinued its baseball program after the 2017 season.
Marshall was a member from 1954 to 1969 and then again from 1997 until 2005.
Northern Illinois was a member from 1973 to 1986, then left until 1997.

References 

Mid-American Conference baseball
NCAA Division I baseball conference players of the year
Awards established in 1986
1986 establishments in the United States